Leonardus Franciscus Maria van de Pas (28 October 1942 ‒ 17 August 2016), known as Leo van de Pas, was a Dutch and Australian historian and genealogist.

Early life
Pas was born on 28 October 1942 in De Bilt, Netherlands to Wilhelmus Martinus (Willem) van de Pas (1901–1960) and Johanna Jacoba Cox (1909–1987). His father was a religious author and Pas grew up in a particularly religious household. After his father's death in 1960, he served in various religious and clerical positions, as well as undertaking his national service in New Guinea (1962). To explore a new life abroad, he immigrated to Australia in 1968, where he took a position as an administrative assistant to the Dutch-Australian author G. M. Glaskin in Perth, Western Australia. He later became a naturalized Australian citizen. As an additional source of income, he also worked for Ansett Airlines until his early retirement in 1994, which enabled him to devote more of his time to his abiding interest in genealogy. After Glaskin's death in 2000, he moved from Perth to Canberra to be closer to van de Pas family members.

Genealogy
Once settled in Australia, Pas wrote, co-authored and contributed to numerous genealogy books and, later on, web articles. He wrote the forewords to other books. His knowledge of genealogy and international reputation enabled him to review and revise the draft work of Princess Michael of Kent, and Michel Roger Lafosse, the self-styled Prince Michael James Alexander Stewart, 7th Count of Albany. He also joined the internet newsgroup "soc.genealogy.medieval" (Gen. Med.) where he interacted with like-minded researchers and helped newcomers from his extensive home library.

Genealogics

Pas's interest in genealogy was matched by his early involvement in computer genealogy. He commissioned a bespoke DOS data entry program from Gary Louth, which turbo-charged his data entry rates. Collaborations with Colin and Rosie Bevan enabled him to extend his electronic holdings. A later collaboration with Brigitte Gastel Lloyd enabled him to start moving his data onto the World Wide Web. Later, in 2003, his collaboration with Ian Fettes enabled him to develop and launch Genealogics, a substantial online reference website and database for medieval and other genealogy. This website is based on TNG software.

Death and legacy
On 17 August 2016, Pas died in Canberra, Australia following a short convalescence.

While he never did establish an ancestral link between his own family history and any notable medieval family, he assisted numerous other people in achieving such connections. His Genealogics website continues to be one of the few free online reference databases covering the medieval and other periods, and is nowadays administered by Ian Fettes and Leslie Mahler. His correspondence with actress Audrey Hepburn provided first-hand public clarification of her early family history.

On 25 October 1988, he was invited by the Australian Prime Minister Bob Hawke to have lunch with the visiting Queen Beatrix of the Netherlands and her husband Prince Claus.

Selected bibliography

Books

Contributed books

Contributed website articles

Ancestors

See also
 Wikidata Property 1819

References

External links
  Genealogics website

1942 births
2016 deaths
People from De Bilt
Death in the Australian Capital Territory
Naturalised citizens of Australia
Dutch genealogists
Australian genealogists